Valentin Knobloch (born 5 May 1980) is a German judoka.

Achievements

References

1980 births
Living people
German male judoka
Luxembourgian male judoka